The 2011 Giro d'Italia Femminile, or Giro Donne, was the 22nd running of the Giro d'Italia Femminile. It was held over ten stages from 1 to 10 July 2012, starting in Rome and finishing with an individual time trial in San Francesco al Campo near Turin.

Stages

Stage 1 
1 July: Rome > Velletri – 86 km

Stage 2 
2 July: Pescocostanzo > Pescocostanzo – 91 km

Stage 3 
3 July: Potenza Picena > Fermo – 104,3 km

Stage 4 
4 July: Forlimpopoli > Forlì – 101 km

Stage 5 
5 July: Altedo > Verona – 129 km

Stage 6 
6 July: Fontanellato > Piacenza – 128 km

Stage 7 
7 July: Rovato > Grosotto – 122 km

Stage 8 
8 July: Teglio > Valdidentro – 70 km

Stage 9 
9 July: Agliè > Ceresole Reale – 114,8 km

Stage 10 
10 July: San Francesco al Campo – Individual time trial – 16 km

Classification
There were five different jerseys awarded in the 2011 Giro Donne. These followed the same format as those in the men's Giro d'Italia, and as in the men's race, the leader of the general classification received a pink jersey. This classification was calculated by adding the combined finishing times of the riders from each stage, and the overall winner of this classification is considered the winner of the Giro.

The other jerseys differ in colour from those of the men's Giro:
The points classification was awarded the maglia ciclamino or mauve jersey. Points are awarded for placements at stage finishes as well as at selected intermediate sprint points on the route, and the jersey is received by the rider with the most overall points to their name.
The mountains classification was awarded the green jersey (maglia verde). Points were allocated for the first few riders over selected mountain passes on the route, with more difficult passes paying more points, and the jersey is received by the rider with the most overall points to their name.
The white jersey (maglia bianca) for the best young rider was given to the highest-placed rider on the general classification aged 23 or under on 1 January 2011 (i.e. born in or after 1988). 
The blue jersey (maglia azzura) was given to the highest-placed Italian rider on the general classification.

Classification progress

Final standings

General classification
Source:

Further reading
In November 2013 a book named Strijd in het vrouwenpeloton: de Giro door de ogen van Marianne Vos en Ellen van Dijk was published. The book is about the experiences of Ellen van Dijk and Marianne Vos of this Giro d'Italia Femminile edition.
 Jeanine Laudy, Jan Willem Verkiel,: Strijd in het vrouwenpeloton: de Giro door de ogen van Marianne Vos en Ellen van Dijk , Tirion Sport .

References

External links
 

Giro d'Italia Femminile
Giro d'Italia F
Giro d'Italia Femminile